The Pentecôte River is a river in the Côte-Nord region or the province of Quebec, Canada. It is a tributary of the Gulf of Saint Lawrence, which it enters beside the community of Rivière-Pentecôte.

Location and name

The Pentecôte River is an important river in the Port-Cartier–Sept-Îles Wildlife Reserve.
It is in the municipality of Port-Cartier in the Sept-Rivières Regional County Municipality, Côte-Nord, Quebec.

In the Innu language the river was called Mistecapiu, meaning "Steep Rock".
The present name may be attributed to the fact that Jacques Cartier arrived in the area on the Christian holy day of Pentecost (Pentecôte is French for Pentecost).
There is a reference to the river in a document by Louis Jolliet from 1685 in which he refers to a river named "Pannecoste".
A 1695 map by Deshayes shows the "Rivière de la Pentecoste".
In 1744 the cartographer Bellin wrote "R. Michigabiou or R. de la Pentecôte; it is also called R. Sainte Marguerite."

Environment

Climate models indicate that further inland the average annual temperature would be  and the average annual rainfall would be .

A map of the Ecological regions of Quebec shows the river rising and flowing south through the eastern spruce/moss domain of the boreal zone.
The last section of the river flows through the fir/white birch domain of the boreal zone.
Most of the watershed is covered in forest dominated by black spruce (Picea mariana), with balsam fir (Abies balsamea) and to a lesser extent hardwoods such as white birch (Betula papyrifera), trembling aspen (Populus tremuloides) and balsam poplar (Populus balsamifera).
On the coastal plain the dominant trees are fir and white spruce (Picea glauca), with white birch and to a lesser extent jack pine (Pinus banksiana), larch (Larix laricina) and trembling aspen.

Fish include Atlantic salmon (Salmo salar) downstream from the Quatorze Arpents Falls.
The Atlantic salmon use the river for breeding.
The young stay in the river for 2 to 4 years, mostly feeding on insect larvae, then run down to the estuary and migrate towards Greenland.
Salmon fishing is allowed, subject to regulations.
An average of 40 catches are reported annually, although the true figure would be higher.

Anadromous brook trout, also known as sea trout, also uses the mouth of the river to feed and sometimes migrates several kilometers from the river mouth to spawn in shallow water.
Other types of fish include rainbow smelt (Osmerus mordax), American eel (Anguilla rostrata), brook trout (Salvelinus fontinalis) and sucker (Catostomidae species). 
Rainbow trout (Oncorhynchus mykiss) is rare but has been reported.

Course

It originates in Lake Bourgeois, one of the lakes along the route of the Cartier Railway, and flows southeast to enter the Gulf of Saint Lawrence beside the community of Rivière-Pentecôte.
It bypasses Mont J'Y-Vois-le-Nord, then continues south through the  Lake Pentecôte to the Saint-Laurent.
It can be navigated by canoe for  up to the Quatorze Arpents Fall.

Tributaries, from upstream to downstream are Coude, Caotibi, De l’Est, Aux Couleuvres, Profonde, Aux Crapauds, Dubé and Du Pont rivers. 

A large storm, or the next spring flood, could cause the river to break through.
The remainder of the reach could then turn into a salt marsh.

Basin

It is in the west of Sept-Rivières.
To the east it is bordered by the watersheds of the Aux Rochers and Riverin rivers, and to the south by the Calumet zone of coastal streams.
To the west it is bordered by the Manicouagan water management zone.

The stream courses are angular, following fractures in the bedrock.
Higher up the streams tend to follow straight courses along narrow valleys, while lower down they meander in the deposits of the coastal plain.

The watershed lies in a region of more or less deformed magmatic rocks, including migmatite, anorthosite, granite, syenite and gneiss complexes.
The higher areas generally have thin soil with many large areas of rocky outcrops.
Several of the valleys hold extensive fluvioglacial sediments.
The coastal plain has large amounts of clay and silt sediments deposited by the Goldthwait Sea after the glaciers withdrew, which were then covered by coarser sandy estuarine and deltaic sediments.

Lakes

Waterbodies including streams and lakes cover 7% of the watershed, while wetlands cover 0.95%, and are mostly found on the coastal plain in flat areas with fine sediments.
The main lakes all have elongated shapes along a north south axis.
They are, from north to south:

Lake Pentecôte

It was formed by the flooding of a glacial valley and is in a trough with steeps sides that in some places rise almost .
Lake Pentecôte is a prime fishing location, but a boat is needed.

Lake Bourgeois

The origin of the name of Lac Bourgeois is not known.
It is just south of the Grand lac Caotibi, to which it is almost connected by a channel.
The south end of Grand lac Caotibi lies along the same line with the north end of Lac Bourgeois, and the Pentecôte River continues south along the same line.
The Cartier Railway, which runs along the MacDonald River valley from the southeast, crosses to Lac Bourgeois and runs along its northeast shore and then along the east shore of the Grand lac Caotibi as it continues north towards Mont Wright.

Lac Bourgeois is on the eastern margin of Sector 17B of the Port-Cartier–Sept-Îles Wildlife Reserve.
The land around the north end of the lake and to the east of the lake is mostly forested with timber over 30 years old, although there are small patches of forest 10-30 year old trees.
The forest east of the south part of the lake is fully protected.

Notes

Sources

External links

Rivers of Côte-Nord